Veado River may refer to these rivers in Brazil:
 Veado River (Itabapoana River) in Espírito Santo
 Veado River (Santo Antônio River) also in Espírito Santo
 Do Veado River in Paraná state